Phola is a genus of leaf beetles in the family Chrysomelidae, subfamily Chrysomelinae. It occurs in east and south-east Asia, the south-west pacific, eastern and northern Australia. It was formerly a synonym of Chalcolampra. It is distinguished from other chrysomeline genera in Australia by the twisted epipleura, but its recognition may render either Chalcolampra or Phyllocharis paraphyletic.

List of species
The genus contains the following species:
 Phola decemmaculata (Lea, 1903)
 Phola delicatula (Lea, 1916)
 Phola octodecimguttata (Fabricius, 1775)
 Phola quadrifasciata (Lea, 1916)
 Phola sedecimpustulata (Stål, 1857)
 Phola tenuis (Lea, 1916)
 Phola vitticollis (Lea, 1915)

References

Chrysomelinae
Beetles of Asia
Beetles of Australia
Chrysomelidae genera
Taxa named by Julius Weise